Patrick Taylor Mendy (born 26 September 1990) is a Gambian-British professional boxer.

Professional career

Mendy fought his first professional fight on 6 March 2009 and had a bad start to his career losing his first two fights against debuters Travis Dickinson and Tobias Webb. But, he went on to win his next two fights, one against debuter Matt Jack on points and next against Luke Allon on points who had a record of two wins in two fights.

On 30 June 2010 Mendy competed in the 13th series of Prizefighter and came out the eventual winner of the competition. He came into the competition following a loss from undefeated Kenny Anderson. In his first fight he beat Sam Horton by TKO in the 1st round and broke the record for the fastest ever knockout in Prizefighter at 82 seconds (1:22min). In the semi-final he beat Daniel Cadman by unanimous decision with all the scorecards reading 29-28 in favour of Mendy. In the final he fought in form Paul David and won on unanimous decision again and received £32,000 for his win, the judges scorecards were all in favour of Mendy, 29-28, 29-28, 30-27.
In this series he broke an outstanding 3 Prizefighter records:
Youngest ever Prizefighter contestant (19 years and 276 days)
Youngest ever Prizefighter winner (19 years and 276 days)
Fastest ever knockout (Vs Sam Horton in 82 seconds (1:22)

On 22 November 2014, Mendy fought against Polish boxer Robert Swierzbinski in Białystok, Poland. Mendy won by unanimous decision and received a first professional belt in his career - WBF in middleweight division.

Professional boxing record

|style="text-align:center;" colspan="9"|39 fights, 19 wins (2 knockouts), 17 losses (2 knockouts), 3 draw
|- style="text-align:center; background:#e3e3e3;"
|style="border-style:none none solid solid; "|
|style="border-style:none none solid solid; "|Result
|style="border-style:none none solid solid; "|Record
|style="border-style:none none solid solid; "|Opponent
|style="border-style:none none solid solid; "|Type
|style="border-style:none none solid solid; "|Round, time
|style="border-style:none none solid solid; "|Date
|style="border-style:none none solid solid; "|Location
|style="border-style:none none solid solid; "|Notes
|- align=center
|39
|Win
|19–17–3
|align=left| Karwan Al Bewani
|TKO
|5 (10), 
|21 May 2021
|align=left|
|align=left|
|- align=center
|38
|Loss
|18–17–3
|align=left| Alexander Rigas
|MD
|8
|26 Sep 2020
|align=left|
|align=left|
|- align=center
|37
|Loss
|18–16–3
|align=left| Fiodor Czerkaszyn
|KO
|7 (8), 
|7 Mar 2020
|align=left|
|align=left|
|- align=center
|36
|Loss
|18–15–3
|align=left| Robert Parzęczewski
|UD
|10
|4 Oct 2019
|align=left|
|align=left|
|- align=center
|35
|Loss
|18–14–3
|align=left| Ričards Bolotņiks
|MD
|8
|23 Mar 2019
|align=left|
|align=left|
|- align=center
|34
|Win
|18–13–3
|align=left| Dmitry Chudinov
|UD
|8
|24 Nov 2017
|align=left|
|align=left|
|- align=center
|33
|style="background:#abcdef;"|Draw
|17–13–3
|align=left| Niklas Räsänen
|MD
|10
|26 Aug 2017
|align=left|
|align=left|
|- align=center
|32
|Loss
|17–13–2
|align=left| Stefan Härtel
|UD
|10
|17 Jun 2017
|align=left|
|align=left|
|- align=center
|31
|Loss
|17–12–2
|align=left| Ali Akhmedov
|UD
|8
|11 Mar 2017
|align=left|
|align=left|
|- align=center
|30
|style="background:#abcdef;"|Draw
|17–11–2
|align=left| Apti Ustarkhanov
|SD
|12
|10 Dec 2016
|align=left|
|align=left|
|- align=center
|29
|Loss
|17–11–1
|align=left| Lolenga Mock
|MD
|10
|04 Jun 2016
|align=left|
|align=left|
|- align=center
|28
|Win
|17–10–1
|align=left| Oscar Ahlin
|UD
|8
|23 Apr 2016
|align=left|
|align=left|
|- align=center
|27
|Loss
|16–10–1
|align=left| Hassan N'Dam N'Jikam
|UD
|8
|12 Mar 2016
|align=left|
|align=left|
|- align=center
|26
|Loss
|16–9–1
|align=left| Kamil Szeremeta
|UD
|8
|26 Sep 2015
|align=left|
|align=left|
|- align=center
|25
|Win
|16–8–1
|align=left| Robert Swierzbinski
|UD
|12
|22 Nov 2014
|align=left|
|align=left|
|- align=center
|24
|Loss
|15–8–1
|align=left| Arif Magomedov
|UD
|12
|09 Aug 2014
|align=left|
|align=left|
|- align=center
|23
|Win
|15–7–1
|align=left| Virgilijus Stapulionis
|PTS
|6
|23 Feb 2014
|align=left|
|align=left|
|- align=center
|22
|Loss
|14–7–1
|align=left| Callum Smith
|TKO
|1 (10), 
|21 Sep 2013
|align=left|
|align=left|
|- align=center
|21
|style="background:#abcdef;"|Draw
|14–6–1
|align=left| Dmitry Chudinov
|PTS
|8
|20 Jul 2013
|align=left|
|align=left|
|- align=center
|20
|Loss
|14–6
|align=left| Patrick Nielsen
|UD
|12
|09 Feb 2013
|align=left|
|align=left|
|- align=center
|19
|Win
|14–5
|align=left| Norbert Szekeres
|PTS
|6
|02 Jun 2012
|align=left|
|align=left|
|- align=center
|18
|Loss
|13–5
|align=left| Bradley Pryce
|PTS
|10
|24 Mar 2012
|align=left|
|align=left|
|- align=center
|17
|Win
|13–4
|align=left| Andrejs Loginovs
|PTS
|4
|21 Nov 2011
|align=left|
|align=left|
|- align=center
|16
|Win
|12–4
|align=left| Tony Randell
|PTS
|4
|27 Oct 2011
|align=left|
|align=left|
|- align=center
|15
|Win
|11–4
|align=left| Paul Samuels
|PTS
|6
|30 Apr 2011
|align=left|
|align=left|
|- align=center
|14
|Win
|10–4
|align=left| Ruslans Pojonisevs
|PTS
|4
|24 Mar 2011
|align=left|
|align=left|
|- align=center
|13
|Win
|9–4
|align=left| Jamie Ambler
|PTS
|4
|06 Nov 2010
|align=left|
|align=left|
|- align=center
|12
|Win
|8–4
|align=left| Paul David
|UD
|3
|30 Jun 2010
|align=left|
|align=left|
|- align=center
|11
|Win
|7–4
|align=left| Daniel Cadman
|UD
|3
|30 Jun 2010
|align=left|
|align=left|
|- align=center
|10
|Win
|6–4
|align=left| Sam Horton
|TKO
|1 (3)
|30 Jun 2010
|align=left|
|align=left|
|- align=center
|9
|Loss
|5–4
|align=left| Kenny Anderson
|PTS
|8
|15 Mar 2010
|align=left|
|align=left|
|- align=center
|8
|Win
|5–3
|align=left| Ally Morrison
|PTS
|4
|01 Dec 2009
|align=left|
|align=left|
|- align=center
|7
|Win
|4–3
|align=left| Sam Couzens
|PTS
|4
|18 Nov 2009
|align=left|
|align=left|
|- align=center
|6
|Win
|3–3
|align=left| Marlon Reid
|PTS
|4
|24 Oct 2009
|align=left|
|align=left|
|- align=center
|5
|Loss
|2–3
|align=left| Jez Wilson
|PTS
|8
|18 Jul 2009
|align=left|
|align=left|
|- align=center
|4
|Win
|2–2
|align=left| Luke Allon
|PTS
|6
|06 Jun 2009
|align=left|
|align=left|
|- align=center
|3
|Win
|1–2
|align=left| Matt Jack
|PTS
|4
|22 Mar 2009
|align=left|
|align=left|
|- align=center
|2
|Loss
|0–2
|align=left| Tobias Webb
|PTS
|4
|14 Mar 2009
|align=left|
|align=left|
|- align=center
|1
|Loss
|0–1
|align=left| Travis Dickinson
|PTS
|4
|06 Mar 2009
|align=left|
|align=left|
|- align=center

References

External links 
 

Living people
Prizefighter contestants
Super-middleweight boxers
Gambian male boxers
1990 births
British male boxers
Gambian emigrants to the United Kingdom